Stary Dwór  is a village in the administrative district of Gmina Koronowo, within Bydgoszcz County, Kuyavian-Pomeranian Voivodeship, in north-central Poland.

External links 
 William Remus: Althof, Kreis Bromberg, West Prussia (2007)

References

Villages in Bydgoszcz County